is a Japanese video game developer and publisher based in Fukuoka. The company was founded in October 1998 by Akihiro Hino after he departed from Riverhillsoft. Early in its history, the company enjoyed a close relationship with Sony Computer Entertainment, with many of its games then funded by and produced in conjunction with them. Level-5 began self-publishing its games in Japan by the late 2000s, with other companies such as Nintendo handling publishing worldwide. The company is best known for their Dark Cloud, Professor Layton, Inazuma Eleven, Ni no Kuni, Yo-kai Watch, and Snack World franchises.

History
Level-5 was established in October 1998 by Akihiro Hino and his development team at Riverhillsoft, following the release of OverBlood 2. Since Hino did not originally believe that his team could become an independent developer, he formed a partnership with Sony Computer Entertainment, who would allow him to develop for their upcoming PlayStation 2 under the condition that he set up his own company. The name, "Level-5", was a reference to Japanese school report cards, where "Level-5" is the highest possible mark. Soon after being created, the company had eleven employees.

Level-5's first full-scale production was the action role-playing game Dark Cloud, developed under contract by Sony Computer Entertainment. Intended to be a launch game for the Japanese release of the PlayStation 2, it was delayed before the console's launch in March 2000 to allow further development, eventually being released in Japan in December 2000, and worldwide in 2001. Work immediately began on a sequel titled Dark Chronicle, released as Dark Cloud 2 in North America.

Midway through 2002, the company had a substantial boost in recognition as it began development on three high-profile games:
 True Fantasy Live Online for Microsoft, an MMORPG which was to become one of the premier games for the Xbox and Xbox Live service in Japan before it was abruptly canceled in 2004.
 Dragon Quest VIII for Square Enix, who had handpicked Level-5 to develop the game under the supervision of series designer Yuji Horii and his team at Armor Project.
 Rogue Galaxy, the studio's third RPG for Sony Computer Entertainment, with a larger budget and more creative freedom than its previous productions with the publisher.

Yasumi Matsuno, director of Vagrant Story, Final Fantasy Tactics, and the Ogre Battle series, briefly joined Level-5 in June 2011, and left the company after completing work on Crimson Shroud for the Nintendo 3DS. By the early 2010s, Level-5 was one of the ten largest video game companies in Japan, holding a market share of 3.2%. In October 2015, Level-5 founded a spin-off company in Santa Monica, in cooperation with Dentsu, called Level-5 Abby. In October 2020, it was reported that the company's North American operations, including Level-5 Abby, were shutting down due to low sales.

Roid service
In 2009, Level-5 launched its Roid (Revolutionary Original Ideas Discovery) service, a mobile phone application that serves as a content delivery platform for mobile games. It is only compatible with NTT DoCoMo's i-mode mobile internet service in Japan. Users pay a monthly fee for access to exclusive games and social game functions. The platform debuted with six games: Sloan and McHale's Mystery Story, Professor Layton and the Mansion of the Mirror of Death Remix, Chara Jo P, Yuuenchi wo Tsukurō Revolution, Treasure Island, and Elf the Dragon. The first three were developed by Level-5, while the last three were developed by outside companies.

List of games
All games were developed and/or published by Level-5 unless otherwise noted

Notes

References

External links
 

 
Video game companies of Japan
Video game development companies
Video game publishers
Companies based in Fukuoka Prefecture
Video game companies established in 1998
Privately held companies of Japan
Japanese companies established in 1998